Richard Bruce Silverman (born May 12, 1946) is the Patrick G. Ryan/Aon Professor of Chemistry at Northwestern University. His group's main focus is basic and translational research into central nervous system disorders and cancer. He is known for the discovery of pregabalin, which is marketed by Pfizer under the brand name Lyrica.

Education
Silverman attended Central High School of Philadelphia. Silverman received his B.S. in chemistry from Pennsylvania State University in 1968. He spent one semester at Harvard University before being drafted and serving as a United States Army Physical Sciences Assistant at the Walter Reed Army Institute of Research from January 1969 until his honorable discharge in January 1971. In June 1974, he received his Ph.D. from Harvard University in organic chemistry with advisor David Dolphin. He then spent two years as a postdoctoral fellow with Robert Abeles in biochemistry at Brandeis University.

Research
Silverman has been teaching and doing research at Northwestern since 1976. He became both Professor of Chemistry and Professor of Biochemistry, Molecular Biology, and Cell Biology in 1986. He has held several named professorships. He was the Arthur Andersen Professor of Chemistry from 1988 to 1996, the Charles Deering McCormick Professor of Teaching Excellence from 2001 to 2003, and the John Evans Professor of Chemistry beginning from 2004 to 2015. He was named the inaugural Patrick G. Ryan/Aon Professor as of September 1, 2015.

The primary focus in Silverman's laboratory is basic research into central nervous system disorders, including Amyotrophic lateral sclerosis (ALS), cerebral palsy, Parkinson's disease, Alzheimer's disease, and epilepsy. Other research areas include cancer (melanoma and hepatocellular carcinoma), and bacterial infection. He has developed novel approaches to the elucidation of enzyme-catalyzed reactions in organic chemistry. He is interested in understanding and developing mechanisms of enzyme inhibition.

Silverman has published over 385 research articles. He has been awarded 128 patents. He has written 3 books: Mechanism-Based Enzyme Inactivation: Chemistry and Enzymology (CRC Press; 1988), Organic Chemistry of Drug Design and Drug Action (Academic Press; 1992, 2004, 2014), and Organic Chemistry of Enzyme-Catalyzed Reactions (Academic Press; 2000, 2002; see the Published works section, below). He is active on the editorial boards of a number of scholarly journals.

Silverman is known for inventing the drug pregabalin as a possible treatment for epileptic seizures. During 1988-1990, Ryszard Andruszkiewicz, a visiting research fellow, synthesized a series of molecules for Silverman. One looked promising. The molecule was transported into the brain, where it activated the enzyme L-glutamate decarboxylase. Silverman anticipated that the enzyme would increase production of the inhibitory neurotransmitter GABA and block convulsions. Eventually, the set of molecules were sent to Parke-Davis Pharmaceuticals for testing. In addition to treating seizures, pregabalin was found to be effective in treating fibromyalgia pain, neuropathic pain, and generalized anxiety disorder. It was approved by the FDA in 2004 and marketed by Pfizer (which bought Parke-Davis) under the trade name Lyrica.

Research has shown that the mechanism of the drug is more complicated than originally anticipated. In addition to its effects on GABA-AT substrate behavior, pregabalin binds to calcium channels and blocks glutamate release. GABA is potentiated, but through a different mechanism than originally suspected.

Awards and honors

Memberships
 2014 Elected to the American Academy of Arts & Sciences
 2014 Fellow of the National Academy of Inventors
 2013 Fellow of the Royal Society of Chemistry
 2011 Fellow of the American Chemical Society
 1990 Fellow of the American Association for the Advancement of Science
 1985 Fellow of the American Institute of Chemists

Medals, Prizes
 2021 Tetrahedron Prize for Creativity in Organic Chemistry
 2017 Award for Creative Invention of the American Chemical Society
 2017 Distinguished Alumnus Award, Pennsylvania State University
 2014 Excellence in Medicinal Chemistry Prize of the Israel Chemical Society
 2014 first recipient of the Northwestern University Trustee Medal for Faculty Innovation and Entrepreneurship
 2014 iCON Innovator Award of the iBIO Institute
 2013 Centenary Prize of the Royal Society of Chemistry
 2013 Bristol-Myers Squibb-Edward E. Smissman Award of the American Chemical Society
 2013 Roland T. Lakey Award from Wayne State University
 2012 Sato Memorial International Award of the Pharmaceutical Society of Japan
 2011 E.B. Hershberg Award for important discoveries in medicinally active substances from the American Chemical Society for the discovery of CPP-115
 2011 inductee into the Alumni Hall of Fame of Central High School of Philadelphia
 2009 Perkin Medal from the American section of the Society of Chemical Industry
 2009 inductee into the Medicinal Chemistry Hall of Fame of the American Chemical Society
 2008 Alumni Fellow Award from the Pennsylvania State University
 2003 Arthur C. Cope Scholar Award of the American Chemical Society
 1982-1987 National Institutes of Health Research Career Development award
 1981 Alfred P. Sloan Foundation Fellow
 1976 DuPont Young Faculty Fellow

Teaching awards
Silverman has received numerous teaching awards from Northwestern University, including the following:
 2001-2004 Charles Deering McCormick Professor of Teaching Excellence
 2000 Alumni Association Excellence in Teaching Award
 1999 Excellence in Chemistry Education Award from the Northwestern University chapter of Alpha Chi Sigma Chemistry Fraternity
 1999 E. LeRoy Hall Award for Teaching Excellence

Philanthropy
Lyrica royalties paid to Northwestern, and a gift from Silverman himself, have supported the Silverman Hall for Molecular Therapeutics and Diagnostics at Northwestern University. Silverman Hall, which opened in 2009, was designed to be a collaborative and interdisciplinary facility housing researchers from chemistry, biology, and engineering.

Published works

Books

References

External links 
 Richard Silverman at Northwestern University

Living people
1946 births
21st-century American chemists
Northwestern University faculty
Harvard University alumni
Fellows of the American Chemical Society
Scientists from Philadelphia
Central High School (Philadelphia) alumni
Eberly College of Science alumni